Sigingstone is a small hamlet in the Vale of Glamorgan, Wales.

It mainly consists of residential housing and two small working farms. There are two roads - one leading to the two nearby towns Llantwit Major and Cowbridge, and the other to Llanmihangel. It also has a 19th-century public house, called the Victoria Inn.

The village name is alternatively spelled "Sigginstone".  This spelling is still used locally.

Llandow Air Disaster 
The village was the location of the 1950 Llandow Air Disaster when an Avro 689 Tudor V crashed killing 80. The aircraft was on its final approach to the nearby Llandow aerodrome.

External links 

Photos of Sigingstone and surrounding area at www.geograph.co.uk
Sigginstone Plane Crash 12 March 1950 at south-wales.org

Villages in the Vale of Glamorgan